Commissar (translit. Komissar) is a 1967 Soviet film directed by Aleksandr Askoldov based on one of Vasily Grossman's first short stories, "In the Town of Berdychev" (В городе Бердичеве). Berdychev is centrally located in the north of Ukraine. The action takes place during the Russian Civil War (1918–22), when the Red Army, White Army, Polish and Austrian contingents were battling for territory. Of equal importance is the fact that in Berdychev, at that time, the Yiddish language was officially instated and, from 1924, it had a Ukrainian court of law conducting its affairs in Yiddish. The plot is based upon an intimate intersection of revolutionary and Jewish cultural manners and ideals. The main characters were played by two People's Artists of the USSR, Rolan Bykov and Nonna Mordyukova. It was made at Gorky Film Studio.

Maxim Gorky considered this brief story one of the best about the Russian Civil War and encouraged the young writer to dedicate himself to literature. It also drew favourable attention from Mikhail Bulgakov, Boris Pilnyak, and Isaac Babel.

History of the film
The film was shot in the political climate of the Khrushchev Thaw, following the death of Stalin. The period is characterized by a loosening of political oppression and artistic censorship. From the outset of the production, Goskino censors forced the film director Aleksandr Askoldov to make major changes; 1967 was the 50th anniversary of the October Revolution and the events were to be presented in the Communist Party-mandated style of heroic realism.

After making the film, Askoldov lost his job, was expelled from the Communist Party, charged with social parasitism, exiled from Moscow, and banned from working on feature films for life. He was told that the single copy of the film had been destroyed. Mordyukova and Bykov, major Soviet movie stars, had to plead with the authorities to spare him of even bigger charges. The film was shelved by the KGB for twenty years.

In 1986, due to glasnost policies, the Conflict Commission of the Soviet Film-makers Union recommended the re-release of the movie, but Goskino refused to act. After a plea from Askoldov at the Moscow Film Festival, the film was reconstructed and finally released in 1988. The film is set in Ukraine, and those who know the language will spot the Ukrainisms in Bykov's lines.

The film won the Silver Bear - Special Jury Prize at the 38th Berlin International Film Festival in 1988, four professional Nika Awards (1989), including one to composer Alfred Schnittke, and other awards. The film was selected as the Soviet entry for the Best Foreign Language Film at the 61st Academy Awards, but was not accepted as a nominee.

Plot
During the Russian Civil War (1918–1922), a female commissar of the Red Army cavalry Klavdia Vavilova (Nonna Mordyukova) finds herself pregnant. Until her child is born, she is forced to stay with the family of a poor Jewish blacksmith Yefim Magazannik (Rolan Bykov), his wife, mother-in-law, and six children. At first, both the Magazannik family and "Madame Vavilova", as they call her, are not enthusiastic about living under one roof, but soon they share their rationed food, make her civilian clothes, and help her with the delivery of her newborn son. Vavilova seemingly embraces motherhood, civilian life, and new friends.

Meanwhile, the frontline advances closer to the town and the Jews expect a pogrom by the White Army as the Red Army retreats. Vavilova attempts to console them with a Communist dream: "One day people will work in peace and harmony", but the dream is interrupted with a vision of the fate of the Jews in the coming world war. She rushes to the front to rejoin her army regiment, leaving her newborn behind.

Themes 
Commissar features strong themes of feminism and motherhood in the backdrop of the Russian Civil War of 1918, and when completed was censored by the Soviet Union due to the subject topic being deemed: "a force that opposes the very essence of human existence, a phenomenon that destroys personal ties by causing alienation, despair, and uncertainty about the future." In effect the censors saw the subject content and focus too negative for a state mandated heroic realism style, as in the opening scene a singing Madonna is passed by a marching regiment that eclipses the sound of her singing with their march. For the censors at the time, to portray the revolution as anything other than a positive change in society was a dangerous risk. Commissar was the only film ever made by the director Aleksandr Askoldov, and it nearly had him arrested by the KGB.

In this opening it is clearly foreshadowed that there would be conflicting themes about motherhood and military service, and this is furthered by the protagonist’s internal struggle between her devotion to the Russian revolution and her devotion to her child. The positivity of the feminist themes are reinforced with the witticisms of the Magazannik family, who have six children, and are more concerned with the wellbeing of their family than with the war. This is best conveyed in a scene where Yefim Magazannik (the father of the family and a local blacksmith) responds to an anecdote by Vavilova about the ideal of the soviet utopia where all men are equal in work with "but what about life?" Though the ending of the film features Klavdia Vavilova fleeing the Jewish household and her newborn son, this is due to the state-mandated style of heroic realism in film eclipsing the themes inherent to the overall work. Vavilova leaving may also be influenced by the children's favorite game, portraying the White Army hunting Jews. Immediately prior to Vavilova deciding to leave, there is a particularly brutal scene where the male children chase and bind their sister, ripping her clothes as she calls out for her mother. Their father reprimands them harshly, but Vavilova appears greatly troubled by the event and may feel a responsibility to prevent this type of brutality.

Vavilova is characterized as unquestionably manly, a 1988 film review done by James Lardner calling her "an inconveniently pregnant Bolshevik [and] a tough cookie". She is first introduced to viewers as a hardened military commissar, having just sentenced a soldier to death for going AWOL to visit his wife. She is respected by her commanding officer, which is made evident when Vavilova states that her deceased lover "was a good communist" to which her boss replies "you are all good communists". However once Vavilova relieves herself of her riding breeches and Mauser handgun, and is settled into the house of the Magazanniks, she falls out of favor with her once gracious coworkers. Once she embraces civilian life and the caveats that come with it, she seemingly loses her masculine qualities as her gun is replaced with her baby, and her leather pants are traded for civilian clothes made for her by the Magazanniks. Towards the end of the film the frontline of the conflict begins to approach the town of Berdichev, and the Red Army begins retreating, Vavilova is left behind with rationed food. The Magazanniks worry that with the coming shift of power there would bring another pogrom committed by the White Army, and Vavilova begins once again to abandon her motherly persona to relay the communist dream that all men will work in peace and harmony. The conflict inherent to the film being that while the revolution rages in the background, the true conflict is that between Vavilova’s treasured child and her patriotism and devotion to her job. In the end of the film Vavilova flees the home of the Magazanniks to attempt to rejoin her cavalry regiment at the front lines.

This complies with the film style of historic realism which acted to appeal to the masses of communist society, the protagonist acting selflessly, abandoning her child in order to join the forces attempting to save the village exemplifies this, and to a degree eclipses the feminist tone of the film in lieu of state mandated propagandist themes. Moreover, the transition from soldier-to-mother further reinforces the feminist tone of the film, as well as contributing to the thaw in Soviet dogma in the late fifties and sixties. In the journal Redressing the Commissar: Thaw Cinema Revises Soviet Structuring Myths, Andsell summarizes the lesson learned by the protagonist and the message conveyed by the director simply:

Askoldov symbolically depicts the Thaw’s search in his heroine’s journey of physical and psychological liberation facilitated by her new, small-family environment. The stages of Klavdia’s emotional and spiritual maturation in the film reverse the symbolic "progress toward consciousness" and the ritual initiation into the "big family" that shaped Stalin-era Civil War discourse, reappearing in the late Thaw quasi-Stalinist narratives. Askoldov’s inverted enactment of a conventional Stalinist rite of passage shows Klavdia undergo its three main phases: separation from previous environment, transition to a new system of values and incorporation into the new community.

Socially the film retrospectively propagates a feminine pride in the socialist ideal, as Vavilova is presented as an independent and powerful woman who initially is seemingly unfazed by the death of her lover. She is more inconvenienced by her pregnancy, and is eager to go back into the fray of the Revolution. At the time of the Revolution, a major principle of the initial communist party was the freedom from discrimination based on religion and gender, and suffrage for women.

Cast
 Nonna Mordyukova as komissar Klavdia Vavilova
 Rolan Bykov as Yefim Magazannik
 Lyudmila Volynskaya as Yefim's mother-in-law
 Vasily Shukshin as Kozyrev, regiment's commander
 Raisa Nedashkovskaya as Maria, Yefim's wife
 Otar Koberidze as Kirill, late lover of Klavdia 
 Valery Ryzhakov as cadet

See also
 List of submissions to the 61st Academy Awards for Best Foreign Language Film
 List of Soviet submissions for the Academy Award for Best Foreign Language Film

References

External links 

"Review," The New York Times, 1988.
 The case of Commissar at National Coalition Against Censorship (NCAC)

1967 films
1960s war drama films
Films about Jews and Judaism
Films based on short fiction
Films directed by Aleksandr Askoldov
Films scored by Alfred Schnittke
Films set in Ukraine
Gorky Film Studio films
Russian Civil War films
1960s Russian-language films
Soviet war drama films
Silver Bear Grand Jury Prize winners
1967 drama films
Films about antisemitism